Plonsters is a children's television program produced by Anima Studio für Film & Grafik GmbH in Hamburg, Germany, and Bettina Matthaei for Egmont Imagination. Each episode is about 3 minutes and 30 seconds long and is produced using stop motion animation done with plasticine, also called claymation. The title is a portmanteau of "plasticine" and "monsters".

Plot 
The show features three small clay monsters, the  Plonsters. They are Plif (the blue plonster), who likes to play practical jokes, Plops (the green plonster) who is the cranky one and Plummy (the orange plonster) who is the cheerful one. They can morph themselves into anything, and their language is some kind of gibberish. The plot of the show is usually that Plif and Plops bully Plummy by ruining everything he does (as well as excluding him from some activities whenever possible), but he gets back at them every time, and every episode ends with the three of them playing together peacefully.

Episodes

Season 1 (1987) 
 Pilot
 Balloon
 Record Player
 Costume Box
 Sharing The Dessert
 The Circus
 Blocks
 Musical Clowns
 The Cookies
 Fishing

Season 2 (1988) 
 Snow Hunt
 The Beautiful Garden
 Gone Fishin'
 The Lonely Island
 Home Sweet Home
 Chaos at the Museum
 Fata Morgana
 Fashion Show
 Checkmate
 The Fruit Market
 Going to Sleep
 Feeding the Ducks
 Safari
 At the Fairground
 Paddling
 Running Up That Hill
 Baking Cookies
 The Treasure Hunter
 Supermarket
 Camping Adventure
 Chaos and Untidiness 
 The Plonsters Fire Brigade
 The Snake Charmers
 Gold Diggers
 Sports Weekend
 The Dinner Party
 On Thin Ice
 Racecar Drivers
 Honey Honey
 Chemical Experiments
 The Sculpture Comes Alive
 At the Circus
 At the Hospital
 Bewitched Scarecrow
 The Raspberry Bush
 Playground Attractions
 Dance with Plonsters
 Surfing with Plonsters
 Miniature Golf
 Arctic Adventure
 The Haunting Of Knight's Castle
 Goin to Venice
 Merry Plonsters-Mas
 Picnic At The Beach
 Plonsters Of The Caribbean
 The Pear Tree
 The Cuckoo Eggs
 How The West Was Really Won
 I Want To Ride My Bike
 In Outer Space
 Collecting Shells

Credits 
 Idea and characters (creator): Bettina Matthaei
 Animators: Isolde Bayer, Axel Nicolai
 Model makers: Katja Calvasova, Eva Galova, Beate Bojanowska, Anke Greß, Sandra Schießl, Lene Markusen
 Production coordinators: Torben Köster, Astrid Olthoff, Kerstin Sprenger
 Editor: Marco Rönnau
 Voices: Ralph Thiekötter
 Music: Petar Vanek
 Sound recording: STUDIO FUNK NG, Christoph Welsche, STUDIO NAMU PRAHA, Adam Memens, Jiři Jahl
 Executive producers: Ulla Brockenhuus-Schack, Christian Lehmann
 Director: Alexander Zapletal

International distribution 
The show aired in Australia on ABC (9 April 2001 - 31 October 2014) and in Norway on TV3. It has also aired on Malaysia narrowcaster Asia Media TransNet, showing in RapidKL coaches.

The show also aired in Canada on YTV between the late 1990s and the early 2000s.  The shorts were also shown on Eureeka's Castle under the title Plastinots.

In Brazil, the show aired on TV Cultura during the 90s on the Glub Glub program.

In Italy, the show aired on Rai 3 sometimes during 2000s/2010s.

In Ireland, the show aired on RTÉ as an integral part of the Bosco show sometimes during 1980s/1990s.

In Japan, the show aired on Fuji TV as part of Hirake! Ponkikki.

In Norway, the show aired on TV3 Norway under the title, Plipp, plopp og plomma, likely during 2008.

In Slovenia, the show aired on TV Slovenia under the title, Plastelinca.

External links
Bettina Matthaei
Plonsters on ABC 4 Kids

1987 German television series debuts
1988 German television series endings
Nick Jr. original programming
Clay animation television series
German children's animated television series
1980s animated television series
1980s preschool education television series
Animated preschool education television series
Animated television series about monsters
Television series about shapeshifting